is a Japanese manga artist born on May 2 in Aichi Prefecture, Japan. She is a resident of Tokyo. She made her debut in the October 1981 issue of Bessatsu Margaret.

Works
 (1986), 1 volume, Shueisha
 (1988), 1 volume, Shueisha
 (1988), 1 volume, Shueisha
 (1989), 1 volume, Shueisha
PM 6:00 Studio P (1989), 2 volumes, Margaret, Shueisha
 (1990–1991), 3 volumes, Margaret, Shueisha
 (1991–1992), 3 volumes, Shueisha
17Easy (1992–1993), 3 volumes, Shueisha
 (1993–1996), 2 volumes, Shueisha
 (1994), 1 volume, Shueisha
 (1994–1996), 6 volumes, Shueisha
 (1997–1998), 2 volumes,
Happy Happy Honey!? (1998), 1 volume, Shueisha
 (1999), 1 volume, Shueisha
 (1999–2000), 2 volumes, Shueisha
 (2001–2004), 3 volumes, Shueisha
3 Years (August 2004), 1 volume, Shueisha
 (June 2005), 1 volume, Shueisha
 (2005–2007), 4 volumes, Deluxe Margaret, Shueisha

Sources:

References

External links
 Cheap Romance (official site)
 斉藤 倫のコミックス試し読み  (official Shueisha site)

Living people
Manga artists from Aichi Prefecture
Year of birth missing (living people)